The Gruta da Lagoa Azul State Park is a state park in the state of Mato Grosso, Brazil. Its primary attraction is a limestone cave with a pool of blue water and unusual cave formations. These have suffered from vandalism, causing the cave to be closed until measures to protect it could be implemented.

Location

The Gruta da Lagoa Azul State Park is in the municipality of Nobres, Mato Grosso.
The blue lagoon cave holds a pool of blue water formed from underground water of the Saloba River.
The main entrance is filled in part by the water.
There may be archaeological remains in the cave.
The park has several other limestone caves.
It is covered with deciduous forests, and is home to howler monkeys, tapirs, jaguars and macaws.

History

On 30 May 1999 an ordinance prohibited public visits until a management plan had been prepared for the purpose of preserving the cave while allowing tourism.
Law 7.369 of 20 December 2000 confirmed the decree creating the park.
The Speleological Management Plan for the cave was approved on 10 February 2014.
The consultative council was created on 15 December 2014.

Threats

The main threat comes from damage by tourists and local agriculture.
The cave has a very fragile ecosystem, dependent on constant temperature and humidity.
Increased CO2 from the visitors' breath and heat from their lights can encourage fungus and lichens to attack the speleothems.
Damage includes broken speleothems, carvings and writing on the walls.
Local residents are aware that the cave has been quite badly vandalised, and that it is a valuable tourist attraction.
They were in favour of closing the cave until a plan could be prepared to prevent further management.

Notes

Sources

Further reading

1999 establishments in Brazil
State parks of Brazil
Protected areas of Mato Grosso
Protected areas established in 1999